Ashdown House may refer to:

Ashdown House, East Sussex, an 18th-century country house in Forest Row, England, now a school
Ashdown House, Oxfordshire, a 17th-century country house in Ashbury, England, belonging to the National Trust